Borsoi is a surname of Italian origin. Notable people with the surname include:

Gino Borsoi (born 1974), Italian former Grand Prix motorcycle road racer
Romano Tozzi Borsoi (born 1979), Italian footballer
Acácio Gil Borsoi (1924-2009), a Brazilian architect and professor 
 Antonio Borsoi (1880-1953) a designer and master craftsman Brazilian. 

Italian-language surnames